Steve Thomas Merritt (January 17, 1945 – January 26, 1993) was an American dancer and choreographer. Together with Nancy and Ronnie Horowitz and Mark Donnelly, Merritt created the musical Dream Street, which played in Las Vegas from 1983 to 1987. Merritt and Donnelly also conceived the Broadway-style format for the Chippendales show. In 1989 Merritt choreographed the opening number of the 61st Academy Awards presentation.

He was born as Steve Thomas Michael Ferraro in San Jose, California, in 1945. He moved to Los Angeles in the mid-1960s and studied dance under David Winter while working as a dancer on a local TV show called The Farmer John Dance Show. He created the Solid Gold Dancers and performed on Casey Kasem's weekly Top Forty Countdown television show.

Merritt died of AIDS in 1993 at age 48 leaving his mother, father, a brother, a sister, a half-brother and a half-sister.

References

External links
 Steve Merritt biography at The Estate Project
 

1945 births
1993 deaths
American male dancers
American choreographers
AIDS-related deaths in California
People from San Jose, California
20th-century American dancers